The Irwin 41 Citation is an American sailboat that was designed by Ted Irwin as a racer and first built in 1982. The design was bases on a custom boat designed by Irwin, named Razzle Dazzle, which won the Southern Ocean Racing Conference (SORC) in 1982.

The Irwin 41 Citation is sometimes confused with the Irwin 41, a cruising sailboat design also introduced in 1982.

Production
The design was built by Irwin Yachts in the United States. A total of four boats were built, starting in 1982, but it is now out of production.

Design
The Irwin 41 Citation is a racing keelboat, built predominantly of fiberglass, with wood trim. It has a masthead sloop rig, a raked stem, a reverse transom, an internally mounted spade-type rudder controlled by a wheel and a fixed fin keel. It displaces  and carries  of lead ballast.

The design has an aft cockpit for steering, but also has a center crew cockpit, separated by a structure that mounts the mainsheet traveler and ventilation intakes for below decks. The companionway ladder is at the front of the center cockpit.

The design has sleeping accommodation for eight people, with a double "V"-berth in the bow cabin, two straight settees in the main cabin both with pilot berths above them and an aft cabin with a double berth. The galley is located on the port side just forward of the companionway ladder. The galley is "L"-shaped and is equipped with a three-burner stove and a double sink. A navigation station is opposite the galley, on the starboard side. The head is located on the starboard side in the aft cabin, with a second door from the navigation station.

Operational history
The boat is supported by an active class club, the Irwin Yacht Owners.

See also
List of sailing boat types

Similar sailboats
Dickerson 41
Irwin 41
Lord Nelson 41
Morgan Out Island 41
Newport 41
Nimbus 42

References

External links
Video deck tour, showing the two cockpits and intervening structure

Keelboats
1980s sailboat type designs
Sailing yachts
Sailboat type designs by Ted Irwin
Sailboat types built by Irwin Yachts